This is the discography documenting albums and singles released by American R&B/pop singer Ralph Tresvant.

Studio albums

Singles

As lead artist

As featured artist

Music videos

References

Discographies of American artists
Rhythm and blues discographies